Cristian Oviedo may refer to:

Cristian Oviedo (Costa Rican footballer) (born 1978), Costa Rican football defensive midfielder
Cristián Oviedo (Chilean footballer) (born 1980), Chilean football centre-back